Women's Games (French: Jeux de femmes) is a 1946 French comedy film directed by Maurice Cloche and starring Jacques Dumesnil, Hélène Perdrière and Saturnin Fabre.

The film's sets were designed by the art director Raymond Nègre.

Cast

References

Bibliography 
 Rège, Philippe. Encyclopedia of French Film Directors, Volume 1. Scarecrow Press, 2009.

External links 
 

1946 films
1946 comedy films
French comedy films
1940s French-language films
Films directed by Maurice Cloche
French black-and-white films
1940s French films